The 2017 Internazionali di Tennis Città di Vicenza was a professional tennis tournament played on clay courts. It was the fourth edition of the tournament which was part of the 2017 ATP Challenger Tour. It took place in Vicenza, Italy between 29 May and 4 June 2017.

Point distribution

Singles main-draw entrants

Seeds

 1 Rankings are as of May 22, 2017.

Other entrants
The following players received wildcards into the singles main draw:
  Matteo Berrettini
  Matteo Donati
  Filip Krajinović
  Gianluca Mager

The following players received entry into the singles main draw as special exempts:
  João Domingues
  Blake Mott

The following player received entry into the singles main draw using a protected ranking:
  Daniel Muñoz de la Nava

The following players received entry from the qualifying draw:
  Federico Coria
  Edoardo Eremin
  Blaž Rola
  Cedrik-Marcel Stebe

Champions

Singles

 Márton Fucsovics def.  Laslo Đere 4–6, 7–6(9–7), 6–2.

Doubles

 Gero Kretschmer /  Alexander Satschko def.  Sekou Bangoura /  Tristan-Samuel Weissborn 6–4, 7–6(7–4).

References

Internazionali di Tennis Citta di Vicenza
Internazionali di Tennis Città di Vicenza
Internazionali di Tennis Citta di Vicenza